The 2014–15 Jackson State Tigers basketball team represented Jackson State University during the 2014–15 NCAA Division I men's basketball season. The Tigers, led by second year head coach Wayne Brent, played their home games at the Williams Assembly Center and were members of the Southwestern Athletic Conference. They finished the season 11–21, 9–9 in SWAC play to finish in a tie for fifth place. They lost in the quarterfinals of the SWAC tournament to Prairie View A&M.

Roster

Schedule

|-
!colspan=9 style="background:#092183; color:#FFFFFF;"| Exhibition

|-
!colspan=9 style="background:#092183; color:#FFFFFF;"| Regular season

|-
!colspan=9 style="background:#092183; color:#FFFFFF;"| SWAC tournament

References

Jackson State Tigers basketball seasons
Jackson State